The 2021 Orlando Open was a professional tennis tournament played on hard courts. It was the third edition of the tournament which was part of the 2021 ATP Challenger Tour. It took place in Orlando, United States between 12 and 18 April 2021.

Singles main-draw entrants

Seeds

 1 Rankings are as of 5 April 2021.

Other entrants
The following players received wildcards into the singles main draw:
  Christian Harrison
  Zane Khan
  Aleksandar Kovacevic

The following players received entry from the qualifying draw:
  Altuğ Çelikbilek
  Martin Damm
  Roberto Quiroz
  Tim van Rijthoven

The following player received entry as a lucky loser:
  Kevin King

Champions

Singles

  Jenson Brooksby def.  Denis Kudla 6–3, 6–3.

Doubles

 Mitchell Krueger /  Jack Sock def.  Christian Harrison /  Dennis Novikov 4–6, 7–5, [13–11].

References

2021 ATP Challenger Tour
2021 in American tennis
April 2021 sports events in the United States
2021 in sports in Florida